Speed Printing is a building in Grand Forks, North Dakota that was listed on the National Register of Historic Places in 1982.

It was built in 1889, as part of a construction boom resulting from the completion of the railroad, and includes "Early Frame Vernacular" architecture.

References

Commercial buildings on the National Register of Historic Places in North Dakota
Commercial buildings completed in 1889
National Register of Historic Places in Grand Forks, North Dakota
1889 establishments in North Dakota
Printing companies of the United States
Vernacular architecture in North Dakota